Henri Derain (27 February 1902 – 21 June 1960) was a French racing cyclist. He rode in the 1929 Tour de France.

References

1902 births
1960 deaths
French male cyclists
Place of birth missing